is a passenger railway station in located in the city of Yokosuka, Kanagawa, Japan, operated by East Japan Railway Company (JR East).

Lines
Kurihama Station is served by the Yokosuka Line. It is the southern terminus of the line and is located 23.9 km from Ōfuna Station, and 73.2 km from the Tokyo Station. It is also located 3 minutes' walk from Keikyū Kurihama Station on the Keikyū Kurihama Line.

Station layout
Kurihama Station has a single island platform connected to the station building by a footbridge. The station has a Midori no Madoguchi staffed ticket office.

Platforms

History
Kurihama Station opened on 1 April 1944 as a station on the Japanese Government Railways (JGR), the pre-war predecessor to the Japanese National Railways (JNR). Freight operations were discontinued from October 1, 1974. The station came under the management of JR East upon the privatization of JNR on April 1, 1987. The station was served by Shōnan-Shinjuku Line trains when the new service started in December 2001, but services as far as Kurihama were discontinued from October 2004.

Passenger statistics
In fiscal 2019, the station was used by an average of 6,338 passengers daily (boarding passengers only).

The passenger figures (boarding passengers only) for previous years are as shown below.

Surrounding area
Kurihama Station is adjacent to JR East's Yokohama Training Center.

See also
List of railway stations in Japan

References

External links

 Kurihama Station information (JR East) 

Railway stations in Kanagawa Prefecture
Railway stations in Japan opened in 1944
Yokosuka Line
Railway stations in Yokosuka, Kanagawa